Joseph J. Oller House is a historic home located at Waynesboro in Franklin County, Pennsylvania. It was built in 1891–1892, and is a 2 1/-2-story, 17 room brick dwelling in the Queen Anne-style. A two-story addition was built in 1910. The house features a multi-gabled slate roof and a projecting round bay topped by a tower and conical roof.  Also on the property is a one-story, wood-frame carriage house and two-story, wood-frame stable.  The property is headquarters of the Waynesboro Historical Society.

It was listed on the National Register of Historic Places in 1996.

References 

History museums in Pennsylvania
Houses on the National Register of Historic Places in Pennsylvania
Queen Anne architecture in Pennsylvania
Houses completed in 1892
Houses in Franklin County, Pennsylvania
National Register of Historic Places in Franklin County, Pennsylvania